Jane Lawrence Smith (February 3, 1915 – August 5, 2005), born Jane Brotherton, was an American actress and opera singer who was part of the New York art scene beginning in the 1950s.

Life and work
Jane Brotherton was born in Bozeman, Montana, and grew up in Mt. Vernon, Washington. Her father was Lawrence Langham Brotherton, a founder of the Bozeman Canning Company.

In 1943 she, created the small role of Gertie in Oklahoma! on Broadway.  The same year, she married Tony Smith, an architect who later achieved fame as a minimalist sculptor. Her close friend Tennessee Williams was best man at her wedding. The Smiths became the parents of three daughters, Kiki Smith, Seton Smith and Beatrice (Bebe) Smith Robinson (herself married to the painter and art critic Walter Robinson, before she died from AIDS).

In 1950 she traveled to Europe and began an opera career in Germany. The next year she sang the part of Elettra in the 1951 Salzburg Festival presentation of Idomeneo, conducted by Georg Solti.

Ms. Smith was one of the last survivors of the central circle of Abstract Expressionist artists and companions who came to the fore in New York in the 1940s and '50s. Her husband was close to Jackson Pollock and Barnett Newman, and she was the subject of one of Pollock's late black-and-white paintings, No. 7 (1952), now owned by the Metropolitan Museum of Art. Two of her daughters, Kiki Smith and Seton Smith, are artists, adding to her prominence in the art world. After her husband's death, in 1980, she resumed her acting career, this time in avant-garde theater, and worked with the directors John Jesurun, Joan Jonas and Marianne Weems. She performed the lead role in the no wave opera XS: The Opera Opus (1984-6) that was created by composer Rhys Chatham and artist Joseph Nechvatal.

Her only film role was that of Clementine Brown in Sailor's Holiday (1944) opposite Arthur Lake and Shelley Winters and in which she was credited as June Lawrence.

Broadway appearances
Oklahoma! (1943) as Gertie Cummings (opening night cast)
Inside U.S.A. (1948) in multiple roles (opening night cast)
Where's Charley? (1948) as Donna Lucia D'Alvadorez (opening night cast)

References

External links

 mp3 of "murmuring tOngue Of Ovid" (20:53) Jane Lawrence Smith reading from Ovid's poem ''Metamorphosis' in 1985 as part of an audio art piece by Joseph Nechvatal on Ubuweb

1915 births
2005 deaths
People from Mount Vernon, Washington
People from Bozeman, Montana
American operatic sopranos
American expatriate actresses in Germany
American stage actresses
American film actresses
Singers from Washington (state)
Singers from Montana
Actresses from Washington (state)
Actresses from Montana
20th-century American actresses
20th-century American women opera singers
21st-century American women